

B

References

Lists of words